The Vanilla Series is Digital Works' brand for its hentai (pornographic) anime, most of which are based on hentai video games. In North America, the series is usually released by Critical Mass. However, at least three of the series was released by other studios. Angel Blade was released by Anime 18, while Office Affairs and Co-Ed Affairs were released by Kitty Media.

Notable works

References

External links 
  Official site
 

Hentai anime and manga